Believe is the debut studio album by Scottish singer and Britain's Got Talent winner Jai McDowall. The album was released on 12 December 2011 via Sony Music and Syco Music. A promotional single, "With or Without You" was released and performed on various UK shows such as Daybreak.

Background
McDowall secured a recording contract after winning the fifth series of ITV talent show Britain's Got Talent on 4 June 2011, beating bookies favorite Ronan Parke. It was reported that after successful meetings between McDowall and judge Simon Cowell, McDowall had been signed by Cowell's record label Syco, and that he had secured a two-album deal in August 2011. Following the signing, McDowall took part in the Britain's Got Talent Live Tour, which saw him perform in several cities in his native country, including Newcastle, Edinburgh, Aberdeen and Glasgow. He later performed at select dates throughout England. In September 2011, he performed live at the official 2011 Glasgow Annual Show in front of 20,000 people.

Recording
On 3 September 2011, it was confirmed that McDowall would be recording a duet with classical soprano Hayley Westenra at some point in the near future. It was soon revealed that the pair were to record a modern version of "The Prayer", a song made famous by Celine Dion and Andrea Bocelli in 1999. McDowall stated in an interview, “When Simon said I should record The Prayer with Hayley, I jumped at the chance. She has the most incredible delicate vocal and she was a dream to work with.” On 3 October 2011, it was confirmed that McDowall's record label Syco had created a joint deal with Sony Music Entertainment to promote his debut album. As such, a music video for one of the album's tracks, "With or Without You", was filmed on Brighton Beach in October 2011, and will be serviced to music channels on 9 December 2011 in promotion of the album. On 26 October, it was announced that the album would be titled Believe, and would receive a release on 12 December 2011.

Production
The album is being entirely produced by Steve Mac, who is known to have worked with the likes of Leona Lewis, Leon Jackson, Susan Boyle and many other acts signed to the Syco label. McDowall stated in an interview: "I've pretty much had creative control over the album. I'll be honest, I was quite surprised with the amount of input I had with the tracks, the cover artwork, and the image. When you talk to previous reality contestants, they tend to say they didn't get that much control. It's an awful, strange thing, cos I was like - I got a lot! Obviously I didn't get complete control, I'm new at it and I don't know the ins and outs. I was quite happy to hand over most of it, to be honest. I think I'd get bored in the studio trying to edit clips of my own voice. I was brought up with a lot of country music like Kenny Rogers, but I've got quite eclectic tastes and have everything from Iron Maiden to Britney Spears on my iPod. I like a lot of R&B but I also love choral music. It kind of depends on my mood but I'm very open-minded about music. The album has a mixture of all sorts, really.

Track listing

Chart performance

Chart positions

Certifications and sales

 United Kingdom: 11,336
 Scotland: 15,000+

Release history

References

2011 debut albums